The 2019 Phillips 66 Big 12 men's basketball tournament was the postseason men's basketball tournament for the Big 12 Conference. It was played from March 13 to 16, in Kansas City, Missouri at the Sprint Center. No. 5 seed Iowa State defeated Kansas 78–66 to win the championship and receive the Big 12’s automatic bid to the 2019 NCAA tournament. It was Iowa State's fourth Big 12 title in the last six years. They also became the first team lower than a four seed to win the tournament.

Seeding
The Tournament consisted of a 10 team single-elimination tournament with the top 6 seeds receiving a bye. Teams were seeded by record within the conference, with a tiebreaker system to seed teams with identical conference records.

Schedule

Bracket

All-Tournament Team

'Most Outstanding Player – Marial Shayok, Iowa State

See also
2019 Big 12 Conference women's basketball tournament
2019 NCAA Division I men's basketball tournament
2018–19 NCAA Division I men's basketball rankings

References

Tournament
Big 12 men's basketball tournament
Big 12 men's basketball tournament
Big 12 men's basketball tournament
College sports tournaments in Missouri